"One Hell of a Woman" is a 1974 song (see 1974 in music) by the American singer-songwriter Mac Davis. The song was written by Davis and Mark James. 

Released as a single from his album Stop and Smell the Roses, the song became Davis' second Top 20 hit on the U.S. pop chart, where it peaked at No. 11 in the fall of 1974. The song remained in the Top 40 for ten weeks. It spent a total of 28 weeks on the national charts, 10 weeks longer than did his number-one hit, "Baby, Don't Get Hooked on Me." Unusually for Davis, the song did not chart on the American country charts.  The song ended up charting in the top ten for 1974 in spite of missing the top ten on the weekly survey.

Chart performance

Weekly charts

Year-end charts

References

External links
 

1974 singles
Mac Davis songs
Songs written by Mac Davis
Songs written by Mark James (songwriter)
1974 songs
Columbia Records singles